Igor Aquino da Silva (born 1 May 1993), known as Igor Cariús or simply Igor, is a Brazilian footballer who plays for Sport Recife. Mainly a left back, he can also play in the other flank or as a central defender.

Career
Born in Cariús, Ceará, Igor started his senior career in 2012 with local side Iguatu, and helped the club to win the third division of the Campeonato Cearense. In 2014, he moved to Barbalha, but returned to Iguatu later in the year for the Copa Fares Lopes.

In March 2015, after playing in the year's Cearense with Quixadá, Igor joined Coruripe. He signed for ASA for the 2016 Série C, where he was a regular starter.

On 21 December 2016, Igor agreed to a contract with Paraná in the Série B. He also featured regularly at his new club before moving to fellow second division side CRB on 4 January 2019.

On 9 February 2021, Igor signed a one-year deal with Série A side Atlético Goianiense.

Personal life
Igor's cousin Edson Cariús is also a footballer who plays as a football. Both played together at Iguatu in 2012, 2013 and 2014, Barbalha in 2014, Quixadá in 2015, Coruripe in 2015 and CRB in 2019.

Career statistics

Honours
Iguatu
 Campeonato Cearense Série C: 2012

CRB
 Campeonato Alagoano: 2020

Atlético Goianiense
 Campeonato Goiano: 2020, 2021

References

External links
 Futebol de Goyaz profile 
 

1993 births
Living people
Sportspeople from Ceará
Brazilian footballers
Association football defenders
Campeonato Brasileiro Série A players
Campeonato Brasileiro Série B players
Campeonato Brasileiro Série C players
Associação Atlética Coruripe players
Agremiação Sportiva Arapiraquense players
Paraná Clube players
Clube de Regatas Brasil players
Atlético Clube Goianiense players
Cuiabá Esporte Clube players
Sport Club do Recife players